Talia is a feminine given name. Alternative spellings include: Taliah, Taaliah, Talya, Tahlia, Taliya, Taliea, Taylia or Talie.

Talia (Aramaic: ‎טַלְיָא or טַלְיָה Ṭalyāʾ "Youth (f.)") is a feminine given name of Aramaic origin, if it can be distinguished from Greek Thalia at all. A folk etymology connects it to Hebrew טל+יה for "dew of God".

People with the given name

Talia
 Talia Balsam, actress
 Talia Castellano, internet celebrity and honorary covergirl
 Talia Chiarelli, Canadian gymnast
 Tylan Grant, actor who formerly went by the name of Talia
 Talia Madison, the ring name of female wrestler Jamie Szantyr, more commonly known as Velvet Sky
 Tahlia McGrath, Australian cricketer
 Talia Shire, actress

Fictional characters
 Queen Talia, in the video game Star Wars: Knights of the Old Republic
 Talia, the name of the dormant princess in an early version of the Sleeping Beauty legend
 Talia al Ghul, from DC Comics
 Talia Gladys, in Mobile Suit Gundam SEED Destiny
 Talia Parra, the titular character of the teen sitcom Talia in the Kitchen
 Talia Sahid, on the American soap opera One Life to Live
 Talia Winters, on the television series Babylon 5
 Talia Wagner, daughter of Nightcrawler and The Scarlet Witch in an alternate universe of X-Men
 Lady Talia, in the children's book Curious George (book)
 Talia, a main character in LoliRock
 "Talia" (also known as Natalia) , the fiancé of Mischa Bachinski from Ride the Cyclone

See also
 Talia (disambiguation)
 Thalia (disambiguation)

References 

Feminine given names